"Tchikita" is a song by French rapper Jul released on 19 September 2016 as a single from his album L'Ovni. It peaked at number three in the French SNEP Singles. Its audio video has 265 million views.

Charts

Weekly charts

Year-end charts

Certifications

References 

2016 singles
2016 songs
French-language songs